Moțăței is a commune in Dolj County, Oltenia, Romania with a population of 8,243 people. It is composed of three villages: Dobridor, Moțăței and Moțăței-Gară.

References

Communes in Dolj County
Localities in Oltenia